Matai may refer to:

Geography
 Matai (Maucatar), a city and suco in East Timor
 Matai, Egypt, a city in the governorate of Al Minya in Egypt
 Matai, Tanzania, a town and administrative seat of Kalambo District, Tanzania
 Matai, New Zealand, a locality in the Matamata-Piako District of New Zealand
 Matai, West Coast, a locality in the Grey District of New Zealand
 Matai River, in Odisha and West Bengal states of India

Plants
 Prumnopitys taxifolia, a tree endemic to New Zealand
 Eleocharis dulcis, the Chinese water chestnut

People
 Jakub Matai (born 1993), Czech ice hockey winger
 Steve Matai (born 1984), New Zealand rugby league player
 Matai Smith (born 1977), New Zealand television presenter

Other uses
 HMNZS Matai (T01), a Royal New Zealand Navy ship
 Matai, a chief in the fa'amatai system of the Samoa Islands

See also
 Mattai (disambiguation)